The Squamish Five is a Canadian docudrama television film, directed by Paul Donovan and broadcast by CBC Television in 1988. The film dramatizes the story of the Squamish Five, the Canadian activist group responsible for the Litton Industries bombing of 1982.

The film's cast included Nicky Guadagni as Ann Hansen, Michael McManus as Brent Taylor, Robyn Stevan as Juliet Belmas, Albert Schultz as Doug Stewart, and David McLeod as Gerry Hannah.

The film faced some criticism for centring Belmas' perspective over those of the other members of the group; however, the producers noted that since Belmas was the only one of the five who had agreed to cooperate with the filmmakers, hers was the only perspective available to build the film's story around.

The film received a preview screening on September 16, 1988, at the 1988 Toronto International Film Festival, in advance of its television premiere on November 6.

Awards

References

External links

1988 films
1988 television films
Canadian drama television films
Canadian docudrama films
Canadian crime drama films
Gemini and Canadian Screen Award for Best Television Film or Miniseries winners
Canadian films based on actual events
English-language Canadian films
Films directed by Paul Donovan
CBC Television original films
1980s Canadian films